Michael, Mike, or Mick Barry may refer to:

Entertainment 
Michael Barry (television producer) (1910–1988), British television producer and executive
Michael Bukht (1941–2011), British radio executive and TV personality who used the pseudonym Michael Barry
Michael Barry (actor), American actor
Michael Barry (born 1946), director of the film The Second Coming of Suzanne
Mike Barry, member of American progressive rock band Yezda Urfa

Sports 
Mick Barry (bowler) (1919–2014), Irish road bowler
Mick Barry (rugby union) (1943–2020), rugby union player who represented Australia
Mike Barry (footballer) (born 1953), English footballer
Mike Barry (American football) (active 1980–2008), American football coach
Michael Barry (cricketer) (born 1991), New Zealand(Auckland) cricketer
Michael Barry (cyclist) (born 1975), Canadian racing cyclist
Michael Barry (Northern Mariana Islands footballer) (born 1995)
Michael Barry (wrestler) (born 1954), Canadian Olympic wrestler

Other 
Michael Joseph Barry (1817–1889), Irish poet and political figure
Michael Maltman Barry (1842–1909), Scottish political activist
Michael A. Barry (born 1948), American historian of the greater Middle East and Islamic world
Mick Barry (Irish politician) (born 1964), Irish Socialist Party politician
Michael Barry (U.S. official), American intelligence programs director
Michael Barry (murderer) (1843–1890), convicted Australian murderer
Michael Barry (writer), Australian writer, editor of the 2003 anthology Elsewhere

See also 
 Barry Michael (born 1955), Australian boxer
 Michael Berry (disambiguation)